John James "Jack" McConnell Jr. (born 1958) is the Chief United States district judge of the United States District Court for the District of Rhode Island.

Early life and education 

Born in Providence, Rhode Island, McConnell earned an Artium Baccalaureus in 1980 from Brown University and a Juris Doctor in 1983 from the Case Western Reserve University School of Law.

Professional career 
From 1983 until 1984, McConnell worked as a law clerk to Rhode Island Supreme Court Associate Justice Donald F. Shea. From 1984 until 1986, McConnell worked as an attorney with Mandell, Goodman, Famiglietti & Schwartz in Providence. From 1986 until 1991, he served as an associate at what now is the law firm Motley Rice. From 1991 until 2011, he was a partner and director of the Environmental practice group at Motley Rice LLC, where he worked with state and local governments, groups, and individuals in cases of personal injury, property damage and economic loss as a result of negligent environmental practices.

McConnell may be most known in his legal career for helping to draft and negotiate a $264 billion, 46-state settlement in the states' lawsuit against the tobacco industry. From 1997 until 2000, McConnell helped investigate the case, file the complaints, and conducted discovery and motions practice in the case while representing many states through its Attorneys General. McConnell disclosed in his questionnaire upon his nomination to federal district court that he anticipates receiving deferred compensation for his work in the tobacco settlement.

McConnell was active in politics, serving as the treasurer of the Rhode Island Democratic State Committee for fourteen years, chairing David Cicilline's mayoral campaign from 2003 to 2009, and serving as a member of the Board of Directors of Rhode Island's Planned Parenthood branch for four years.

Federal judicial service 
On November 17, 2008, McConnell sent a letter to U.S. Senators Jack Reed and Sheldon Whitehouse, expressing his interest in being nominated for the vacancy on the U.S. District Court for the District of Rhode Island that had been created by Judge Ernest C. Torres assuming senior status. McConnell interviewed with both of his state's senators in February 2009. In April 2009, McConnell learned that Reed would recommend his name to the White House for the nomination. President Obama formally nominated McConnell to the seat on March 10, 2010. On June 17, 2010, the U.S. Senate Judiciary Committee recommended McConnell's nomination by a 13–6 vote. On May 4, 2011, cloture was invoked on his nomination by a 63–33 vote. The Senate confirmed him later that day by a 50–44 vote. He received his commission on May 6, 2011. He became Chief Judge on December 1, 2019.

See also
 Barack Obama judicial appointment controversies

References

External links

1958 births
Living people
Brown University alumni
Case Western Reserve University School of Law alumni
Judges of the United States District Court for the District of Rhode Island
Lawyers from Providence, Rhode Island
United States district court judges appointed by Barack Obama
21st-century American judges